Zhirnovsky District is an administrative district (raion), one of the thirty-three in Volgograd Oblast, Russia. As a municipal division, it is incorporated as Zhirnovsky Municipal District. It is located in the north of the oblast. Its administrative center is the town of Zhirnovsk. Population:  47,575 (2002 Census);  The population of Zhirnovsk accounts for 38.6% of the district's total population.

References

Notes

Sources

Districts of Volgograd Oblast